The 2002 OFC U-20 Qualifying Tournament was held in Fiji and Vanuatu from December 7 to December 22, 2002 to determine the entrant into the 2003 FIFA U-20 World Cup. The match schedule was revised following the late withdrawal of the Cook Islands from Group A.

Participating teams

Referees

New Zealand
 Derek Rugg
 Ken Wallace

Papua New Guinea
 Job Minan
 Gidas Bayung

Fiji
 Leone Rakaroi

Australia
 Con Diomis
 Doug Rennie

Vanuatu
 Ron Wilbur
 Harry Atisson

Tahiti
 Charles Ariiotima

Matches

Group A

Group B

Final

1st Leg

2nd Leg

Australia win 15-0 on aggregate.

Winners

Australia qualified for the 2003 FIFA U-20 World Cup.

Goalscorers
There were 65 goals scored during the tournament, not including the 1 own goal scored.

7 goals
 Scott McDonald

5 goals
 Patrick Wahopie
 Isoa Rokobici

4 goals
 Michael Baird
 Mitchell Brydon
 Roderick Kumar

3 goals
 Alex Brosque
 Leopold Wanakaija

2 goals

 Franco Parsi
 Vince Lia
 Teukihakausiu Nafe
 Morgan Mcgarrison
 Stuart Hogg
 Ross Mckenzie
 Brent Fisher

1 goal

 Alex Davani
 Ricky Mesak
 James Salai
 Roger Waiwai
 Carl Valeri
 David Tarka
 Matt McKay
 Dustin Wells
 Master Papani
 Viliami Vaitaki
 Andy Boyens
 Nathan Strom
 Matthew Adams
 Jarrod Smith
 Wayen Rooker
 Kiwi Timo
 Alofa Alatise
 Kevin Duffy
 Desmond Faaiuaso
 Robert Hellesoe
 Junior Slade
 Fabrice Toto
 Henri Selefen
 Kevin Kahlemu
 Josue Mapone
 Luke Vidovi
 Robert Wise
 Ronil Kumar
 Lorima Dau
 Osea Vakatalesau

External links
Tournament Details
Results by RSSSF

OFC U-20 Championship
Under 20
2002
2002
2002 in youth association football
2002 in Vanuatuan sport
2002 in Fijian sport